The Chemehuevi Indian Tribe of the Chemehuevi Reservation (Colorado River Numic language: Nüwüwü) is a federally recognized tribe of Chemehuevi people, who are the southernmost branch of Southern Paiute people.

To celebrate their organization under the Indian Reorganization Act, tribal recognition, and ratifying their constitution, the tribe hosts Nuwuvi Days, an annual festival held during the first weekend in June.

Reservation
The reservation  is  large and has a population of 345.

Government
The Chemehuevi Indian Tribe's headquarters is located in Havasu Lake, California. The tribe is governed by a democratically elected, nine-member tribal council.

Economic development
The tribe owns and operates Havasu Landing Resort, Casino and Hotel on Lake Havasu, near Needles, California.

Cemetery

Notes

References
 D'Azevedo, Warren L., Volume Editor. Handbook of North American Indians, Volume 11: Great Basin'''. Washington, DC: Smithsonian Institution, 1986. .
 Pritzker, Barry M. A Native American Encyclopedia: History, Culture, and Peoples.'' Oxford: Oxford University Press, 2000. .

External links
 Chemehuevi Indian Tribe , official website
  official website

Native American tribes in Arizona
Native American tribes in California
Federally recognized tribes in the United States